David Francis Hardwick MD, FRCPC, FCAP (January 24, 1934 – May 15, 2021) was a Canadian medical academic and researcher in the field of paediatric pathology.  Hardwick was involved with The University of British Columbia (UBC) for more than sixty years as a student, professor, and Professor Emeritus. His research included the first description of histopathologic implications of differential survival of Wilms' Tumors to pathogenesis of L-methionine toxicity and administrative/management research.

The University of British Columbia
In 200, UBC awarded Hardwick an Honorary Doctor of Laws degree in recognition of his commitment to the principles of academic freedom. In his acceptance speech he spoke of " ...the opportunity to chase one's own rainbow's end...", noting that such opportunity does not exist widely outside the university environment, and exhorting new graduates to do what they can to preserve academic freedom.

Hardwick attributed his achievements to his ability to build connections with multiple institutional entities, and to strengthen connections among different generations of medical practitioners. He spoke publicly of the importance of collegial activity in an article "Our Academy as an Exciting Academic Forum":

As Associate Dean, Research and Planning, in the UBC Faculty of Medicine from 1990 to 1996, Hardwick helped build government relationships that advanced the academic and scientific missions of UBC and its teaching hospitals. In addition, Hardwick also improved relationships between UBC and its teaching hospitals and for establishing teaching and research facilities at these sites. Among those achievements were:

	establishment of the first British Columbia Children's Hospital;
	establishment of the UBC Medical Student and Alumni Centre (MSAC); opened March 17, 1990,    dedicated and renamed the William A. Webber Medical Student and Alumni Centre May 5, 2007.

Hardwick served the University and the wider community in many capacities, including

	Head, Vancouver General Hospital, Division of Pædiatric Pathology, 1962–1980
	Chair, Medical Advisory Committee, Vancouver Children's Hospital, 1970–1987
	Chair, UBC Senate Curriculum Committee, 1974–1975
	Head, UBC, VGH, Children's Department of Pathology, 1974–1990
	Head, Department of Pathology, UBC, 1976–1990
	Head, Children's Hospital, Department of Pathology, 1980–1990
	Director of Inter-institutional Planning and Associate Dean, Research, Faculty of Medicine, UBC, 1990–1996
	Associate Dean, Research and Planning, 1990–1999
	President, International Academy of Pathology (IAP), 1993–1994
	Special Advisor on Planning, Faculty of Medicine, UBC, 1999–Present
	Chair, Board of Directors, BC Transplant Foundation, 2000–2001
	Chair, Capital Expansion Committee, Medical School Expansion, 2003–2005
	Chair, Finance Committee, United States and Canadian Academy of Pathology (USCAP), 2003–2004
	Member, Organizing Committee, Asia Pacific International Academy of Pathology (IAP) Congress, 2004–2005
	International Secretary, International Academy of Pathology, 2006–2014
	International Secretary Emeritus, International Academy of Pathology, 2014–present

Awards

Hardwick's achievements and service include:
	1974	Certificate of Merit, Master Teacher Awards, UBC
	1994	The University of British Columbia Teaching Excellence Award and Prize
	1996	Senior Research Investigator, BC Research Institute for Child and Family Health
	1978	Canadian Silver Jubilee Medal, Government of Canada
	1987	Faculty Citation Award, The University of British Columbia Alumni Association
	1990	Wallace Wilson Leadership Award (1990) UBC
	1991	Service Award, President - United States and Canadian Academy of Pathology
	1996	Sydney Israels Founders Award, BC Research Institute for Child & Family Health
	1997	President's Award for service to The University of British Columbia
	2001	Doctor of Laws – Honorary Degree, The University of British Columbia
	2001	Honorary Member, International Academy of Pathology, Hong Kong Division
	2002	Just Desserts Award, Alma Mater Society, The University of BC
	2002	Gold Medal of the International Academy of Pathology (IAP), Washington, D.C.
	2003	Senior Member, BC Medical Association
	2004	President's Award, US and Canadian Academy of Pathology
	2005	Founders of Pædiatric Pathology – Society for Pædiatric Pathology
	2007	Lifetime Achievement Award, UBC Alumni Association
	1997	Sydney Farber Award, Society for Pædiatric Pathology
	2004	The Bartholomew Mosse Centenary Lecture, Rotunda Hospital, Dublin, Ireland
	2008	Award of Excellence, The College of Physician & Surgeons, British Columbia
       2017    Medical Alumni Association Founder's Award, British Columbia

Early years and education

Hardwick was born in 1934 in Vancouver, British Columbia, to a family of educators. He received his education, including his medical education, at the University of British Columbia, graduating in 1957.  Hardwick pursued post graduate training in Montreal, PQ; Charlotte, NC; Vancouver, BC, and Los Angeles, CA, first in Pædiatrics and then in Pathology, Medical Biochemistry and Developmental Physiology. He began his teaching, research and administrative career at The University of British Columbia in 1963 in the Department of Pathology.

Researcher

Hardwick's research training in Physiology and Pathology led to numerous publications including an early conclusion that the histological appearance of Wilms' tumours affected clinical outcome—at that time a new observation—and in 1971 to an elucidation of the pathogenesis of Methionine toxicity.  His work in the area of pædiatric pathology includes a study of metabolic diseases of childhood. His research into methods for screening inborn errors of metabolism has led to the investigation and reporting, with co-workers, of numerous cases. In the field of pathophysiology his research focused on the effect of vasomotion or lack of vasomotion on tissue pathology and viability in normal tissues and in tumours. 
Hardwick's ongoing interest in governance led to his research on inter-dependent relationships in inter-institutional systems, and in the area of clinical pathology his research into physician behaviour has led to practical hypotheses of laboratory test ordering patterns with testable interventions.

Later studies have focused on economic effects of clinical laboratory testing. His second book, Directing the Clinical Laboratory, is a summation of 27 years' experience in this aspect of his research.

Educator

Hardwick received the Certificate of Excellence Master Teaching Award in 1974, and the University Teaching Excellence Award and Prize in 1994. Students' fondness for him is illustrated by the number of nominations he has received for teaching awards determined by the student body, which has elected him as Faculty Advisor to the Medical Advisory Undergraduate Society for 23 consecutive two-year terms.  In 1994, the Committee for Accreditation of Canadian Medical Schools (CACMS) review of the UBC Faculty of Medicine congratulated the Department of Pathology for the design of the undergraduate pathology course that Hardwick directed, and noted that it was the students' "recognized best course in the School of Medicine" and one that "all other Departments should emulate".

Administrator and innovator

Since the 1960s, Hardwick was a major influence in the Faculty's decision-making. He was Head of Pathology for 14 years from 1976, attracting and producing many talented educators, researchers, and practitioners during his tenure. He then became Associate Dean of Research and Planning and on retiring was invited to stay on as Special Advisor on Planning. He was heavily involved in the expansion of the undergraduate medical program since 2003; a provincial government supported initiative to address the shortage of medical practitioners, especially prevalent in rural areas.

Hardwick was quick to grasp the potential of information technology, and served on UBC's E-Strategy Committee, examining how new technologies could best be employed in learning and research. He implemented training changes early on at UBC, creating a University administration system to switch from hospital to university administrated Residency Programs (1971), followed by the creation of an administrative structure to support the combined Women's and Children's Hospital as Chief of Medical Staff (1982).  He conceptualized, and Fred Silva of the United States and Canadian Academy of Pathology (USCAP) worked to implement the Knowledge Hub for Pathology.  This is an interactive repository of current knowledge that provides knowledge to pathologists worldwide (76 million hits in 2010), free, until its "best before" date at which time it is replaced by more up-to-date information.

International career

Hardwick taught, lectured and presented at conferences around the globe. In recognition of his international work he was awarded the Gold Medal of the International Academy of Pathology (IAP) in 2003. Awarded only every second year, this honor recognizes individuals who have contributed international service to the Academy and to the field of pathology in the areas of education, research and service. He was responsible for hospital campus facility creation and AV/IT provision for UBC's distributed Medical School expansion throughout BC, and was the International Secretary for the International Academy of Pathology (IAP), the world's largest and oldest pathology society.

Hardwick served as IAP President in 1994 at the Hong Kong Congress and remained engaged as a Vice-President, North America to enhance international education.  He was instrumental in putting the Inter-congress Education Committee in place and began to re-structure the IAP.  In 2005, he was asked by the Armed Forces Institute of Pathology (AFIP) to work with them and others to determine a strategy for preserving the AFIP in an era of drastic budget cuts. Ultimately, the medical function was transferred to "Joint Services", and the museum repository, unique in the world, was maintained.

Later activities

Professor Hardwick worked with the BC Government Ministries of Health Services and Education Advancement to create new academic facilities at hospitals and clinics throughout British Columbia. This process began in early 2002 in response to the BC Government's decision to more than double the enrolment of undergraduate students, from 128 per year to 288 per year, and postgraduate residency trainees by a small number. In addition to overseeing the planning and implementation of approximately $50,000,000 of structural facilities, Hardwick advised on creation of the advanced video conference, lecture and seminar facilities for the program.

These facilities (structural and AV/IT) are also used extensively for interdisciplinary education at all the sites, with special implementation at partner university campuses (University of Victoria, University of Northern British Columbia, University of British Columbia Okanagan Campus (UBCO)) and at the major clinical academic campuses of the Vancouver Fraser Program, Island Medical Program, Northern Medical Program, and Southern Medical Program.

He served as the Secretary to the International Academy of Pathology, and worked to monitor and support web information, divisional programs worldwide and to advise the international office with special emphasis on biennial congresses in underserved countries: São Paulo in 2010, Cape Town in 2012, Bangkok in 2014, Jordan in 2016 and Glasgow 2020.  He was Chair of the US Canadian IAP Division Long-term Planning Initiative.

Professor Hardwick was also co-founder of a series of books on classical liberalism.

He died on May 15, 2021.

British Columbia Children's Hospital

The first British Columbia Children's Hospital owes its existence in part to his efforts. As Chair of the Medical Advisory Committee of the original Children's Hospital Hardwick brought various medical and lay community groups together in achieving the new Children's Hospital. After the Children's Hospital amalgamated with Women's Hospital, forming the new Children's and Women's Hospital, Hardwick served on the Board of Directors from 1998 to 2001. The UBC David F. Hardwick Pathology Learning Centre (DHPLC) in the Diamond Health Care Centre, which houses the pathology medical museum specimens, is an example of educational resource for learning about the causes and mechanisms of human disease, and for studying clinicopathologic correlations.

Bibliography

	Hardwick, D.F. and Stowens, D. "Wilms' Tumors", J. Urol. 85:903 (1961).
	Hardwick, D.F., Misrahy, G.A., Garwood, V.P. and Strauss, J. "Kidney Oxygen Availability", Am. J. Physiol. 205:322 (1963).
	Hardwick, D.F., Applegarth, D.A., Cockcroft, D.W., Calder, R.J. and Ross, P.M. "Pathogenesis of Methionine-Induced Toxicity", Metabolism, 19:381 (1970).
	Hardwick, D.F., Morrison, J.I., Tydeman, J., Cassidy, P.A. and Chase, W.H. "Laboratory Costs and Utilization:  A Framework for Analysis and Policy Design", J. Med. Educ., 56:307-315 (1981).
	Hardwick, D.F., diZerega, G., and Hardwick, W.G. "Directing change: a contemporary administrative challenge". Modern Pathology 10:380-383 (1997).
	Hardwick, D.F.  "Directoring" and Managing in a Professional System." Modern Pathology 11: 585-592, 1998.
	Karkan, D.M., Hardwick, D.  "Lack of vasomotion and its effect on tissue oxygen tension in diabetic and hypertensive rats"  Archives.  Experimental Pathology, 1:322-30. (1999).
	Hardwick, D.F., "THE KNOWLEDGE HUB FOR PATHOLOGY©" – the USCAP's "Pathology Commons" – wide open - fully stocked and free to all who wish to visit the Website!, Human Pathology, 2007.
	Hardwick, D.F., Medical Science is a Self Organizing Social Environment. Cosmos + Taxis, October 2008.  
       Hardwick, D.F. and Marsh, L. Philanthropic Institutional Design and the Welfare State. In Conversations on Philanthropy, Vol. IX: Law and Philanthropy, 2012.
       Hardwick, D.F. and Marsh, L. Science, the Market and Iterative Knowledge. Cosmos + Taxis'', 2012.
       Hardwick, D.F. and Marsh, L. Clash of the Titans: When the Market and Science Collide. Advances in Austrian Economics Vol. 17, 2012.
       Hardwick, D.F. and Marsh, L. eds. Propriety and Prosperity: New Studies on the Philosophy of Adam Smith. Palgrave-Macmillan, 2014.
       Hardwick, D.F. and Marsh, L. eds. Jazz as a Spontaneous Order. Cosmos + Taxis 5:1, 2017
       Hardwick, D. F. and Marsh, L. Eds. Reclaiming Liberalism. Palgrave-Macmillan, 2020.
       Hardwick, D. F. and Marsh, L. Liberalism, Through a Glass Darkly. In: Reclaiming Liberalism''. Eds. D. F. Hardwick and L. Marsh. Palgrave-Macmillan, 2020.

References 

 

1934 births
People from Vancouver
Canadian pathologists
Academic staff of the University of British Columbia
University of British Columbia alumni
2021 deaths